Sumbaviopsis is a genus of plants in the family Euphorbiaceae first described as a genus in 1910.  It contains only one known species, Sumbaviopsis albicans, native to Yunnan, the eastern Himalayas, and Southeast Asia (Indochina, Malaysia, Indonesia, Philippines).

References

Chrozophoreae
Monotypic Euphorbiaceae genera
Flora of Asia